StyleTap is a Palm OS simulator/compatibility layer/emulator for the Windows Mobile/Windows CE, Symbian OS, iOS and Android operating systems.  It emulates Palm OS 5.2 and earlier. Applications written for Palm OS show up as native programs and operate in the same way.

StyleTap works on the following platforms:
 Windows Mobile 6 Professional
 Windows Mobile 6 Standard
 Windows Mobile 5 for Pocket PC
 Windows Mobile 5 for Smartphone
 Pocket PC 2003SE (including full VGA support)
 Pocket PC 2003
 Pocket PC 2002
 Pocket PC 2000
 Various OEM customizations of Windows CE 4.2 and later
 Symbian S60v3
 Symbian S60v5
 Symbian^3
 Symbian Anna
 Symbian Belle (buggy - opening certain menus crashes the program)
 iOS v3.x.x firmware/iOS4 (requires Cydia)
 Android

See also
Windows Mobile
Symbian
Palm OS
Palm OS Emulator
iOS
Android

References

External links
StyleTap
PHEM: Palm Hardware Emulator, a port of POSE to Android
PHEM on Google Play

Pocket PC software
Symbian software
Windows Mobile Standard software
Palm OS
Android emulation software